Lilia B. Cuntapay (September 16, 1935 – August 20, 2016) was a Filipina actress and former teacher. She is popularly recognized as the "Queen of Philippine Horror Movies" for her subsequent appearances in horror movies and exceptional contributions to Philippine film industry.

Cuntapay's debut role was in the Filipino horror film series Shake Rattle & Roll in 1991. She found acclaim for her first leading role, in the film Six Degrees of Separation from Lilia Cuntapay, which won her an award as "Best Actress" in the 2011 CinemaOne Originals Digital Film Festival. One of Cuntapay's final TV appearances was in the teleserye FPJ's Ang Probinsyano.

Early life
Cuntapay was born in the Cabiraoan village of Gonzaga, Cagayan, on September 16, 1935. After she earned her BS degree in Education, she taught in the primary school levels in Tuguegarao.
After Cuntapay stopped teaching, she ventured into the buy-and-sell trade. She also worked in various office staff-level positions in the National Police Commission (NAPOLCOM).

Career

Horror movie extra
Cuntapay was among the 40 actors trained in the first batch of acting workshops conducted by Lori Reyes and Peque Gallaga for LVN Pictures.

In 1991, Cuntapay played the spooky nanny of Kris Aquino's character in Shake Rattle & Roll 3, and in the following year she was cast  to play a character identified as an "aswang" —a role for which she would later be typecast in many subsequent movie appearances, and these earned her the title "Queen of Philippine Horror Movies." After her death a film critic, who assessed the top five performancess of Cuntapay's career, said that in her role for the 1992 film Aswang :

Television appearances
In 2009, Cuntapay appeared as an albularyo in the ABS-CBN afternoon TV series Precious Hearts Romances Presents: Bud Brothers. She was featured in the Kapuso Mo, Jessica Soho 2009 Halloween Special. She appeared as Rosanna, a role which she shared with Maricar Reyes, in the Midnight DJ episode named "Kwentas ng Mangkukulam". Cuntapay was also cast as Miley Cyrus in Lokomoko High'''s spoof of the Party in the USA music video. At the end of the year, she had a minor role in the film Nobody, Nobody But... Juan — an entry to the 2009 Metro Manila Film Festival.

In 2010, Cuntapay played an old lady in The Last Prince and a fairy disguised as an old lady in the "Inday Bote" episode of Wansapanataym. The following year, she played Upeng in the mini-series Sa Ngalan ng Ina, the first offering of TV5's TV5 Miniserye series in the latter part of 2011.

Six Degrees of Separation from Lilia Cuntapay and onwards
Cuntapay played a fictionalized version of herself in the independent mockumentary Six Degrees of Separation from Lilia Cuntapay—described as a bittersweet fictional account on Cuntapay's life as a Philippine showbiz extra, an entry to the 2011 Cinema One Originals and directed by Antoinette H. Jadaone. The film won six awards in the 2011 Cinema One Originals Digital Film Festival, including a Best Actress award for Cuntapay.

Cuntapay's last film appearance was My Bebe Love in 2015, which was an entry in the 2015 Metro Manila Film Festival. Cuntapay's final TV show appearance was in the action series FPJ's Ang Probinsyano''.

Personal life
Cuntapay never remarried but adopted 3 children: Gilmore, Magdalena and Elma.

Death
On August 5, 2016, it was confirmed that Cuntapay suffered from a spinal cord illness and that she was unable to walk. She sought help from her friends and colleagues in the film industry to be able to raise money for her treatment. On August 20, at about 6 a.m, Cuntapay died in her son's home at Barangay Tartarabang in Pinili, Ilocos Norte; she was 80. Her grave was initially unkempt and marked only by a dilapidated tarpaulin due to her family's lack of funds to maintain it. In October 2019, it was subsequently reported that her grave had been properly marked and its surroundings cleaned after help from the provincial and local government.

Filmography

Television

Films

Awards and nominations

Notes

References

External links

1935 births
2016 deaths
ABS-CBN personalities
Filipino film actresses
Filipino television actresses
Ilocano people
People from Cagayan
People from Ilocos Norte
People from Tuguegarao
20th-century Filipino actresses
21st-century Filipino actresses